is a private university (for graduate studies) in Niigata, Niigata, Japan, with branch campuses in Tokyo and in Nagaoka, Niigata. It was established in 2006.

External links
 Official website

Educational institutions established in 2006
Private universities and colleges in Japan
Universities and colleges in Niigata Prefecture
Universities and colleges in Tokyo
2006 establishments in Japan